Musselburgh Athletic Football Club are a Scottish football club based in the town of Musselburgh, East Lothian. Formed in 1934, they have played under different names including Musselburgh Bruntonians, Musselburgh Juniors and Musselburgh Fern since 1898. Nicknamed "the Burgh", they play their home games at Olivebank Stadium, in the Fisherrow area of the town. The club's strips are the blue and white colours of Musselburgh with their town's badge displayed on their chests.

In 2019 the club won the South & East of Scotland Cup-Winners Shield which allowed them to take part in the Scottish Cup for the first time in 2020–21.

In seasons 2010–11 and 2014–15 they reached the final of the Scottish Junior Cup, both times narrowly losing 2–1 to Ayrshire team Auchinleck Talbot.

Current squad
As of 16th January 2023

Honours

Major Honours
Scottish Junior Cup
 Winners: 1922–23
 Runners-up: 2010–11, 2014–15

East Region Premier League
 Winners: 2008–09, 2017–18

Other Honours
 South & East of Scotland Cup-Winners Shield: 2019–20
Alex Jack Cup: 2019–20
 East Region League Division 1 Championship: 1970–71
 East Region League Division 2 Championship: 2000–01
 Dalmeny Cup: 1908–09, 1911–12
 East Lothian Cup: 1911–12
 Simpson Shield: 1911–12, 1914–15
 Marshall Cup: 1914–15
 Musselburgh Cup: 1935–36
 East of Scotland Cup: 1936–37
 St Michael Cup: 1936–37, 1937–38, 1966–67, 2007–08, 2008–09
 Thistle Cup: 1972–73
 Brown Cup: 2003–04, 2007–08, 2008–09
 Lothian League Cup: 2005–06

Gallery

References

External links
 Club Website
 Facebook
 Twitter

Football clubs in Scotland
Scottish Junior Football Association clubs
Association football clubs established in 1934
Football in East Lothian
Musselburgh
1934 establishments in Scotland
East of Scotland Football League teams